Canuck is an unincorporated community within the Rural Municipality of Lone Tree No. 18, Saskatchewan, Canada. It is located on Highway 18, 12.5 km east of the village of Climax.

Demographics

In 2006, Canuck had a population of 0 living in 0 dwellings, a 0% increase from 2001.

History

Canuck was once a booming community, with a few small businesses and storefronts along the main street, three grain elevators all have since been demolished, and a small schoolhouse that has also been demolished. Since the late 1930s Canuck's population dwindled and the community is now completely abandoned.

See also
 List of communities in Saskatchewan
 Ghost towns in Saskatchewan

References

Lone Tree No. 18, Saskatchewan
Populated places established in 1912
Unincorporated communities in Saskatchewan
Ghost towns in Saskatchewan
1912 establishments in Saskatchewan
Division No. 4, Saskatchewan